Shailendra Singh is an Indian playback singer and actor. He sang several Hindi and a few Marathi songs during the late 1970s and early 1980s. He was very close to Mehmood Ali.

Early life
Shailendra Singh was born on 4 October 1952 in Mumbai, India to a Punjabi family. He studied at Hill Grange High School at Peddar Road, and did his graduation from St. Xavier's College, Mumbai. He then joined the Film and Television Institute of India in Pune to train as an actor. He also learnt classical Hindustani music from a Guru. He first break as a playback singer in the film, Bobby, during his second year at the FTII.

Career
Shailendra Singh had many hit songs to his credit. Raj Kapoor gave Singh a break when he signed him for Bobby. The song "Main Shayar To Nahin" became a big hit. His song "Humne Tumko Dekha" from the film Khel Khel Mein rocked the entire nation. His rendition of "Jaane Do Na" from Saagar along with Asha Bhosle added to the sensuality of the entire song. He tried his hand at acting in films like Agreement (with Rekha) and Do Jasoos, but those films flopped.

In addition to his singing career, he acted in a Bengali film Ajasra Dhanyabaad, opposite  Aparna Sen.

In 1994, he was hospitalized for complication due to diabetes. He says that “The talk in the industry was that I had a heart attack and that I had died. I didn’t die. But the rumours killed my career.” He considers himself better in singing than in acting.

Filmography

Films

Television

Discography

Awards
1974 – Nominated for Filmfare Award for Best Male Playback Singer – "Mai Shayar Toh Nahi" (Bobby).

References

External links
 
Lyrics of songs sung by Shailendra Singh

1952 births
Living people
Bollywood playback singers
Indian male singers
Musicians from Mumbai
St. Xavier's College, Mumbai alumni
Film and Television Institute of India alumni
Hill Grange High School alumni